The governor-general was the chief administrator of the Japanese colonial government in Chōsen from 1910 to 1945. Terauchi Masatake was the first governor-general. Prior to becoming governor-general, he was the third and the last resident-general. Upon the annexation of Korea to Japan, he became the governor-general.

There were ten governors-general, while eight individuals served in this position. Saitō Makoto and Ugaki Kazushige both served two nonconsecutive terms as governor-general. Saitō was the third and the sixth governor-general, and Ugaki was the fourth and seventh governor-general. Thus, Minami Jirō, Koiso Kuniaki, and Abe Nobuyuki were respectively the eight, ninth, and tenth governors-general, but they were respectively the sixth, seventh, and eight individuals to serve as governors-general.

Governors-general

See also 
 Japanese Resident-General of Korea
 List of Japanese residents-general of Korea
 Japanese Governor-General of Korea
 Governor-General of Taiwan

Korea, Governors-General
Korea, Governors-General
Japanese Governors-General
Japanese Governors-General